The Sheridan County Courthouse, located at the intersection of Burkett and Main Streets in Sheridan, is the seat of government of Sheridan County, Wyoming. Built from 1904 to 1905, the courthouse was the first built in the county. The firm of Link & McAllister designed the courthouse; their design features elements of the Classical Revival and Beaux-Arts styles. The courthouse is topped by an octagonal dome with oval and rectangular windows and a balustrade. The building's entrance features a pediment and frieze supported by two Ionic columns. In 1913, a jail with a sheriff's residence was added to the courthouse site; this building has a similar design to the courthouse.

The courthouse was added to the National Register of Historic Places on November 15, 1982.

References

External links

Courthouses on the National Register of Historic Places in Wyoming
Neoclassical architecture in Wyoming
Beaux-Arts architecture in Wyoming
Government buildings completed in 1905
Buildings and structures in Sheridan County, Wyoming
County courthouses in Wyoming
National Register of Historic Places in Sheridan County, Wyoming
Sheridan, Wyoming
1905 establishments in Wyoming